NYQ may refer to:

 Nayini language (ISO 639:nyq), a Central Iranian language
 New York Quarterly, an American poetry magazine
 Tennant Company (TNC:NYQ), an American company that manufactures cleaning solutions